A.S.D. F.C. Bassano Romano is an Italian association football club located in Bassano Romano, Lazio. Having surrendered the title of Serie D, it currently plays in Terza Categoria, the lowest level of the Italian football. Its colors are red and blue.

External links
 Official homepage

Football clubs in Italy
Association football clubs established in 1962
Football clubs in Lazio
Italian football clubs established in 1962